State Route 225 (SR 225) is a north–south state highway in northeastern Ohio. It passes through the mostly rural areas of northern Stark County and southeastern Portage County. The road is two lanes almost the entire length, except for the portion at the partial interchange with the future U.S. Route 62 just north of the Alliance city limits. State Route 225 is co-signed with U.S. Route 224 from the western border of Deerfield Township east to the Deerfield Circle and with State Route 14 for a short distance as it turns north from the circle. It crosses Interstate 76 at exit 48 in Palmyra Township just north of its intersection with Tallmadge Road (County Road 18), formerly designated as State Route 18.

History
State Route 225 was first designated in 1924, though initially it ran along part of what is now Alliance Road in Portage County, extending from the current U.S. Route 224 to the south and ending at State Route 14 in the small town of Yale to the north.

In 1931, State Route 225 was routed along what is now the northern section of State Route 183 from Atwater Center north to Edinburg.  By 1937, it was again rerouted and extended, returning to its original location to Yale, but this time going  further north to State Route 18, and extending south to Alliance along its current alignment south of U.S. Route 224.  As part of the construction of the new Interstate 80S, part of SR 18 was rerouted onto the new freeway by 1966, leaving the northern terminus of SR 225 at the former SR 18 (Tallmadge Road). By 1969, the northern terminus of SR 225 was moved back to SR 14 in Yale as the section of SR 225 between Yale and SR 18 was decommissioned. In 1970, State Route 225 was rerouted once again to its current alignment, turning east along U.S. Route 224 to Deerfield Center and then turning north at State Route 14 along what had previously been designated State Route 627.

Major intersections

References

225
Transportation in Portage County, Ohio
Transportation in Stark County, Ohio